Athyma libnites is butterfly endemic to Sulawesi, Indonesia. It was described by William Chapman Hewitson in 1859.

Subspecies
 A. l. libnites (Sulawesi)
 A. l. noctesco Tsukada, 1991 (Buton)
 A. l. nieuwenhuisi Hanafusa, 1989 (Banggai)

External links
 Butterflies of Southeastern Sulawesi

Athyma
Butterflies described in 1859